The Unlikely Pilgrimage of Harold Fry is an upcoming British film directed by Hettie Macdonald and starring Jim Broadbent and Penelope Wilton. It is adapted from the 2012 book of the same name by Rachel Joyce. The film will be released into UK and Irish cinemas on 28 April 2023.

Synopsis
A man in his sixties walks the length of the country, from Devon to Berwick-upon-Tweed, in order to deliver a message to a friend he has learned has been placed in a hospice.

Cast
 Jim Broadbent as Harold
 Penelope Wilton as Maureen
 Bethan Cullinane as Younger Maureen 
 Linda Bassett 
 Joseph Mydell as Rex
 Monika Gossman as Martina
 Maanuv Thiara as Mick
 Manoj Anand
 Nina Singh as Garage Girl

Production
The project was set to be directed by Hettie Macdonald, with Kate McCullough as director of photography, production design by Christina Moore, and costume design by Sarah Blenkinsop. The film was produced by Kevin Loader, Juliet Dowling and Marilyn Milgrom, and was developed with Film4 and the BFI; financing was arranged by Embankment Films and provided by the BFI and Ingenious. It was the biggest investment made in new film by the BFI in 2021. Broadbent joined the project to play Harold in February 2021. Wilton joined the project in June 2021.

Filming
Filming took place entirely on location to match Harold’s walk in the story. Filming began in Devon in September 2021. Filming also took place in Gloucestershire, on the border between Wakefield and Dewsbury, and Sheffield, Yorkshire.

Release
The film will be released in UK cinemas on 28 April 2023.

References

External links

 
Upcoming films
2020s British films
2020s English-language films
2023 comedy films
British Film Institute films
Films based on British novels
Films shot in England
Films shot in Sheffield
Films shot in South Yorkshire
Films shot in Devon
Films shot in Gloucestershire
Films shot in Yorkshire